MV Nottingham was a refrigerated cargo motor ship that was built in Scotland in 1941 for the Federal Steam Navigation Co. On her maiden voyage a u-boat torpedoed her, sinking her with all hands.

She was the first of two ships of this name in the Federal Steam fleet. The second  was a motor ship that was launched in 1949 and scrapped in 1971.

Building
In 1941 Alexander Stephen and Sons of Linthouse, Glasgow built a pair of refrigerated cargo ships for Federal Steam. Gloucester was launched on 3 March 1941 and completed that July. Her sister ship Nottingham was launched on 12 August and completed at the beginning of November.

Each had a single screw driven by a Barclay, Curle & Co six-cylinder, single-acting, two-stroke diesel engine.

Loss
At the beginning of November 1941 Nottingham left Glasgow on her maiden voyage. She was bound for New York with a general cargo that included Scotch whisky. Her Master was Captain Francis Cecil Pretty, who in 1917 had been awarded the DSC when he was a Lieutenant in the Royal Naval Reserve, and in February 1941 had been made an OBE for keeping control of his ship after she was damaged by enemy action.

Nottingham tried to ram the U-boat, but missed. The U-boat fired a torpedo from one of its stern tubes, which hit Nottingham in the stern at 2234 hrs. Nottingham stopped, and at 2250 hrs U-74 fired a spread of two torpedoes, both of which missed. At 2259 hrs a further torpedo from the U-boat hit Nottingham, sinking her.

U-74 saw Nottinghams crew abandon ship in her lifeboats. But none of the boats was seen again, and all of Nottinghams 56 crew and six DEMS gunners were lost.

References

1941 ships
Cargo ships of the United Kingdom
Maritime incidents in November 1941
Ships built on the River Clyde
Ships lost with all hands
Ships sunk by German submarines in World War II
World War II merchant ships of the United Kingdom
World War II shipwrecks in the Atlantic Ocean